The Balkan-Romance languages,  form a sub-branch of the Romance language family.

Languages

Balkan-Romance comprises Romanian (or Daco-Romanian), Aromanian (or Macedo-Romanian), Megleno-Romanian and Istro-Romanian, according to the most widely accepted classification of the Romance languages. The four languages sometimes labelled as "dialects" of Romaniandeveloped from a common ancestor  mostly referred as Common Romanian. They are surrounded by non-Romance languages. Judaeo-Spanish (or Ladino) is also spoken in the Balkan Peninsula, but it is rarely listed among the other Romance languages of the region because it is rather an Iberian Romance language that developed as a Jewish lect of Old Spanish in the far west of Europe, and it only began to be spoken widely in the Balkans after the influx of Ladino-speaking refugees into the Ottoman Empire in the 16th century.

References

Sources

 

 
Languages of the Balkans